The Judge of Appeal is a part-time judge in the Isle of Man High Court who only sits in the Staff of Government Division, the appeal court.

The position was created by the Judicature (Amendment) Act 1918 which also amalgamated the offices of First Deemster and Clerk of the Rolls. The judge must be an English King's Counsel.

The current Judge of Appeal is Jeremy Storey KC.

Judges of Appeal
Sir Francis Taylor KBE KC, 1918-1921
Arthur Ashton KC, 1921-1925
Ernest Wingate-Saul KC, 1925-1928
John Singleton KC, 1928-1933
Major Harold Derbyshire MC KC, 1933-1936
Robert Chappell KC, 1936-1938
John Morris CBE MC KC, 1938-1947
Lieutenant-Colonel Patrick Barry MC KC, 1947-1950
Albert Gerrard QC, 1950-1953
Neville Laski QC, 1953-1956
John Crichton QC, 1956-1961
Daniel Brabin MC QC, 1961-1962
Joseph Cantley OBE QC, 1962-1965
Major Richard Bingham TD QC, 1965-1972
Lieutenant-Colonel Cecil Clothier QC, 1972-1979
Iain Glidewell QC, 1979-1980
Benet Hytner QC, 1980-1997
Geoffrey Tattersall QC, 1997–2017
Jeremy Storey KC, 2017–Present

See also
Deemster
Isle of Man High Court
Clerk of the Rolls
Manx Judiciary

Manx law
Judiciary of the Isle of Man